The canton of Sciez is an administrative division of the Haute-Savoie department, southeastern France. It was created at the French canton reorganisation which came into effect in March 2015. Its seat is in Sciez.

It consists of the following communes:

Anthy-sur-Léman
Ballaison
Boëge
Bogève
Bons-en-Chablais
Brenthonne
Burdignin
Chens-sur-Léman
Douvaine
Excenevex
Fessy
Habère-Lullin
Habère-Poche
Loisin
Lully
Margencel
Massongy
Messery
Nernier
Saint-André-de-Boëge
Saxel
Sciez
Veigy-Foncenex
Villard
Yvoire

References

Cantons of Haute-Savoie